Mill Creek is a stream in northern Dallas County in the Ozarks of southwest Missouri. It is a tributary of the Niangua River.

The stream source area lies east of Missouri Route 73 and it flows east passing north of the Lead Mine Conservation Area. It flows parallel to Missouri Route E and past the community of Celt prior to its confluence with the Niangua River.

Mill Creek was named on account of the watermills along its course.

See also
List of rivers of Missouri

References

Rivers of Dallas County, Missouri
Rivers of Missouri